Ethelwine (or Æthelwine) was Abbot of Abingdon.

Æthelsige died in 1018 and was succeeded by Æthelwine (Anglo-Saxon Chronicle, version E), who is said to have died in 1030 (Kelly 2000). Æthelwine enjoyed a close relationship with King Cnut. His skills as a goldsmith were illustrated by his production of a reliquary for Cnut and for the abbey

References 

Hudson, John, 2007. Historia Ecclesie Abbendonensis:The History of the Church of Abingdon, 
Kelly, S. E. 2000. Charters of Abingdon, part 1. Anglo-Saxon Charters 7.

1030 deaths
Abbots of Abingdon
Year of birth unknown